Thomas Henry Wade (24 November 1910 – 25 July 1987) was an English cricketer who played first-class cricket for Essex from 1929 to 1950, mainly as a wicket-keeper. 

Tom Wade was born in Essex and began playing for the county cricket team in 1929 as an off-spin bowler and lower-order batsman. He took 33 wickets in his first season, including his best figures of 5 for 64 in the second innings in a close victory over Somerset. He had fewer opportunities in the next few seasons, although he made his highest score of 96 against Oxford University in 1932.

He took up wicket-keeping, and soon achieved such a high standard that in 1934 he displaced Roy Sheffield as the Essex wicket-keeper. In late 1936 he was on a private visit to Australia when he was asked to keep wicket for the English touring team, which had lost its two wicket-keepers to illness and injury. He played in three matches in October and November until Les Ames returned to fitness.

Wade kept playing for Essex until fibrositis compelled him to retire in 1950. He was a popular player, and his benefit yielded nearly £4000, a record for Essex at the time.

References

External links
 

1910 births
1987 deaths
People from Maldon, Essex
Essex cricketers
English cricketers
Wicket-keepers
Marylebone Cricket Club cricketers
English cricketers of 1919 to 1945